Ni Ni (born 8 August 1988) is a Chinese actress best known for portraying Yu Mo in the 2011 film The Flowers of War, directed by Zhang Yimou; and Ling Xi in the 2019 television series Love and Destiny. She is considered to be one of the “New Four Dan Actresses” by Southern Metropolis Daily.

Early life
Ni was born on 8 March 1988 in Nanjing, Jiangsu, China. She graduated from the Communication University of China, Nanjing, majoring in television broadcasting and hosting.

Career
Ni made her debut in Zhang Yimou's war film The Flowers of War, playing the lead female character "Yu Mo". She received acclaim for her performance in the film and rose to fame.

In 2012 and 2013, Li starred in the mystery film Redemption alongside Liu Ye, romance film Love Will Tear Us Apart and road-trip drama film Up in the Wind.

In 2014, Ni starred in the coming-of-age film Fleet of Time. In 2015, Ni starred alongside Angelababy in the Chinese remake of Bride Wars.

In 2016, Ni starred in the Chinese-French fantasy The Warriors Gate, written by Luc Besson.
The same year, she starred in the romantic comedy film Suddenly Seventeen, directed by Zhang Yimou's daughter.

In 2017, Ni starred in fantasy action film Wu Kong, as well as science fiction wuxia film The Thousand Faces of Dunjia directed by Tsui Hark.

In 2018, Ni starred in her first television drama, The Rise of Phoenixes alongside Chen Kun. She released her first single, "Why to No Avail" as part of the soundtrack of the series. Forbes China listed Ni under their 30 Under 30 Asia 2017 list which consisted of 30 influential people under 30 years old who have had a substantial effect in their fields.

In 2019, Ni returned to the big screen in the crime heist film Savage. She then made her theater debut in the play One One Zero Eight directed by Stan Lai. The same year, Ni starred in the fantasy romance drama Love and Destiny alongside Chang Chen. The series received positive reviews, and Ni gained acclaim for her portrayal of a fairy maiden that went through numerous struggles to attain happiness.

In 2020, Ni starred alongside Andy Lau in the action thriller Shock Wave 2.

In 2021, Ni was cast in the drama Night Wanderer, adapted from the popular time-travel themed novel "Ye Lv Ren" (夜旅人) by Zhao Xi Zhi alongside Deng Lun.

Endorsements
Ni has been the Chinese ambassador for Jaeger-LeCoultre since 2011 and now a global spokesperson for Jaeger-LeCoultre. She was named as the global ambassador for SK-II in 2013.

In 2014, she was selected to be the brand ambassador for Uniqlo in China, and now a global spokesperson for Uniqlo.

She was the official global ambassador of Tiffany & Co. between 2017 and 2019.

Ni has been the official brand ambassador of Gucci since 2017 and a global ambassador for Gucci's Eyewear since 2019. Since 2022, she has been announced as Global Brand Ambassador of Gucci.

Ni has been the global ambassador of Bobbi Brown Cosmetics since 2019 and a global ambassador of Cindy Chao The Art Jewel since 2021.

Since 2022, French luxury beauty house Lancôme announced Ni as their Global Skincare and Fragrance Ambassador.

Filmography

Film

Television series

Television show

Short film and documentary

Theatre

Discography

Awards and nominations

Forbes China Celebrity 100

References

External links

 
 Ni Ni at hkmdb.com
 Ni Ni at chinesemov.com

1988 births
Living people
21st-century Chinese actresses
Actresses from Nanjing
Chinese film actresses
Chinese television actresses
Best Newcomer Asian Film Award winners